Jos Klijnen (7 January 1887 – 5 January 1973) was a Dutch architect. His work was part of the architecture event in the art competition at the 1924 Summer Olympics.

References

1887 births
1973 deaths
19th-century Dutch architects
20th-century Dutch architects
Olympic competitors in art competitions
People from Maastricht